Alvis Forrest Gregg (October 18, 1933 – April 12, 2019) was an American professional football player and coach. A Pro Football Hall of Fame offensive tackle for 16 seasons in the National Football League (NFL), he was a part of six NFL championships, five of them with the Green Bay Packers before closing out his tenure with the Dallas Cowboys with a win in Super Bowl VI. Gregg was later the head coach of three NFL teams (Cleveland Browns, Cincinnati Bengals, and Green Bay Packers), as well as two Canadian Football League (CFL) teams (Toronto Argonauts and Shreveport Pirates). He was also a college football coach for the SMU Mustangs.

As a head coach, he led the 1981 Bengals to the Super Bowl, where they lost to the San Francisco 49ers, 26–21.

Early life and college career
Born in October 18, 1933 in Birthright, Texas, Gregg attended Sulphur Springs High School in Sulphur Springs and played college football at Southern Methodist University in Dallas.  Playing on both the offensive and defensive line at SMU, Gregg earned All-Southwest Conference honors in his final two seasons.

Playing career
Gregg was a key player in the Packers dynasty of head coach Vince Lombardi that won five NFL championships and the first two Super Bowls. He played mostly at right tackle, but also filled in at guard. He earned an "iron man" tag by playing in a then-league record 188 consecutive games in 16 seasons from 1956 until 1971. He also won All-NFL honors for eight straight years from 1960 through 1967 and nine Pro Bowl selections.

Gregg closed his career with the Dallas Cowboys, as did his Packer teammate, cornerback Herb Adderley. They both helped the Cowboys win Super Bowl VI in January 1972, making them the only players (along with former teammate Fuzzy Thurston, who was on the Baltimore Colts NFL championship team in 1958 and Tom Brady of the New England Patriots and Tampa Bay Buccaneers) in professional football history to play on six NFL title teams. Gregg wore the number 75 for 15 seasons in Green Bay, but that number belonged to Jethro Pugh in Dallas, so Gregg wore number 79 for his final season in 1971.

It has been reported that Vince Lombardi said, "Forrest Gregg is the finest player I ever coached!" but official Packers team historian Cliff Christl can find no evidence of Lombardi ever saying or writing that.  In 1999, he was ranked 28th on The Sporting News list of the 100 Greatest Football Players, putting him second behind Ray Nitschke among players coached by Lombardi, second behind Anthony Muñoz (whom he coached) among offensive tackles, and fourth behind Munoz, John Hannah, and Jim Parker among all offensive linemen.

Coaching career
After serving as an assistant with the San Diego Chargers in 1973, he took a similar position the following year with the Browns.  After head coach Nick Skorich was dismissed after the 1974 season, Gregg was promoted to head coach in 1975, a position he held through 1977.

After sitting out the 1978 season, Gregg returned to coaching in 1979 with the Canadian Football League's Toronto Argonauts.  In 1980, he became the head coach of the Cincinnati Bengals for four seasons through 1983. His most successful season as a head coach was in 1981, when he led the Bengals to a 12–4 regular season record. They defeated the San Diego Chargers 27–7 in the AFC championship game (known as the Freezer Bowl), earning them a trip to Super Bowl XVI, where they lost to the San Francisco 49ers, 26–21.

When his longtime former teammate Bart Starr was fired after nine years as head coach of the Packers in December 1983, Gregg was allowed out of his Bengals' contract to take over in Green Bay. He finished his NFL coaching career with the Packers, leading them for four seasons, 1984–1987, with a record of 25-37-1. Gregg's overall record as an NFL coach was 75 wins, 85 losses and one tie.  He was also 2–2 in playoff games, all with the Bengals. He is one of only two coaches, the other being Marvin Lewis, to have left the Bengals with a winning record.

Gregg resigned from the Packers in January 1988 and took a pay cut to take over at SMU, his alma mater. He was brought in to revive the Mustang football program after it received the "death penalty" from the NCAA for massive violations of NCAA rules. Though the NCAA had only canceled the 1987 season, school officials later opted to cancel the 1988 season due to fears that fielding a competitive team would be impossible; nearly every letterman from the 1986 squad had transferred elsewhere. Gregg knew that any new coach would be essentially rebuilding the program from scratch, but when acting president William Stalcup asked him to return, he felt he could not refuse.

As it turned out, when Gregg arrived, he was presented with a severely undersized and underweight roster composed mostly of freshmen. Gregg was taller and heavier than nearly the entire 70-man squad. The team was so short on offensive linemen that Gregg had to make several wide receivers bulk up and switch to the line. By nearly all accounts, it would have been unthinkable for the Mustangs to return for the 1988 season under such conditions.
  
In 1989, the Mustangs went 2–9, including a 95–21 thrashing by Houston—the second-worst loss in school history. In that game, eventual Heisman Trophy winner Andre Ware threw six touchdown passes in the first half, and David Klingler added four more in the second, even with the game long out of reach.  Gregg was so disgusted that he refused to shake Houston coach Jack Pardee's hand after the game.  Nonetheless, Gregg reflected fondly on the experience. In a 2012 interview with The New York Times, he said the players on the two teams he coached should have had their numbers retired for restoring dignity to the program. "I never coached a group of kids that had more courage," he said. "They thought that they could play with anyone. They were quality people. It was one of the most pleasurable experiences in my football life. Period."

After the season, Gregg was named SMU's athletic director. The Mustangs went 1–10 in 1990, and after the season, he resigned as coach to focus on his duties as athletic director. Gregg's coaching record at SMU was 3–19, and he served as athletic director until 1994.

He returned to the CFL with the Shreveport Pirates in 1994–95, during that league's brief attempt at expansion to the United States. His overall record in the CFL was 13–39.

When former Shreveport Pirates owner Bernard Glieberman bought a stake in the Ottawa Renegades in May 2005, Gregg was appointed Ottawa's vice president of football operations, a position he held through 2006.

Personal life
Gregg married Barbara Dedek in 1960. In the 1970s, he had multiple surgeries for skin cancer.

He retired to Colorado Springs, Colorado. In October 2011, he was diagnosed with Parkinson's disease, thought to be caused by concussions from playing over two decades of high school, college, and professional football.
 
On April 12, 2019, Gregg died at the age of 85 due to complications from Parkinson's disease.

In addition to his wife, he was survived by a son, Forrest Jr.; a daughter, Karen Gregg Spehar; and several siblings.

Head coaching record

College

NFL

CFL

References

External links
 
 
 

1933 births
2019 deaths
American football offensive tackles
American football offensive guards
Cleveland Browns coaches
Cleveland Browns head coaches
Cincinnati Bengals head coaches
Dallas Cowboys players
Green Bay Packers general managers
Green Bay Packers head coaches
Green Bay Packers players
San Diego Chargers coaches
Shreveport Pirates coaches
SMU Mustangs athletic directors
SMU Mustangs football coaches
SMU Mustangs football players
Toronto Argonauts coaches
Pro Football Hall of Fame inductees
Western Conference Pro Bowl players
People from Hopkins County, Texas
Coaches of American football from Texas
Players of American football from Texas
Deaths from Parkinson's disease
Neurological disease deaths in Colorado